The 2010-11 Liga Mexicana Élite season was the first season of the new semi-professional ice hockey league in Mexico. Prior to 2010-11, there had only been a national championship held at the end of the year.

Regular season

Playoffs

Semifinals
 Aztec Eagle Warriors - Teotihuacan Priests 0:2 (1:5, 1:2 OT)

Final 
 Mayan Astronomers - Teotihuacan Priests 1:2 (0:5, 5:4, 1:2)

External links
 Season on hockeymexico.com

Liga Mexicana
Lig
Lig